Lambton—Kent was a federal electoral district in Ontario, Canada, that was represented in the House of Commons of Canada from 1935 to 1979. This riding was created in 1933 from parts of Kent, Lambton East and Lambton West ridings.
 
It was initially defined as consisting of:
 the part of the county of Lambton contained in the townships of Brooke, Dawn, Enniskillen, Euphemia, Sombra, and Warwick, including the town of Forest, Walpole Island, St. Ann Island and the other islands at the mouth of the St. Clair River; and
 the part of the county of Kent contained in the townships of the Gore of Chatham, Gore of Camden, Camden and Zone.

In 1947, it was redefined to exclude the village of Arkona (Lambton County); and the townships of Gore of Camden (Kent County).

In 1966, it was defined to consist of: 
 the part of the County of Kent contained in the Townships of Camden, Chatham, Dover, Harwich, Howard, Orford and Zone;
 the part of the County of Lambton contained in the Townships of Brooke, Dawn, Euphemia, Enniskillen and Sombra;
 Walpole Island Indian Reserve No. 46.

The electoral district was abolished in 1976 when it was redistributed between Essex—Kent, Kent and Lambton—Middlesex ridings.

Members of Parliament

This riding elected the following Members of Parliament:

Electoral history

See also 

 List of Canadian federal electoral districts
 Past Canadian electoral districts

External links 
 Parliamentary website

Former federal electoral districts of Ontario